Bibb August Falk (January 27, 1899 – June 8, 1989) was an American left fielder in Major League Baseball who played for the Chicago White Sox (1920–28) and Cleveland Indians (1929–31).

Born in Austin, Texas, Falk played football and baseball at the University of Texas before signing with the White Sox in 1920. He was a spare outfielder with the Sox until news of the 1919 Black Sox scandal broke and eight players were suspended; Falk replaced Shoeless Joe Jackson in left field. Falk was a consistent hitter, ending his career after twelve seasons with a .314 career batting average. He was also known as a heady player whose merciless riding of opponents earned him the nickname "Jockey." His best season was in 1926 with the White Sox; he had a .345 batting average, 43 doubles, and 108 runs batted in, and finished 12th in the MVP voting that year. After the 1928 season, he was traded to the Cleveland Indians for Chick Autry, and played three more seasons in the major leagues before retiring as a player and becoming a coach.

In 1353 games over 12 seasons, Falk posted a .314 batting average (1463-for-4652) with 655 runs, 300 doubles, 59 triples, 69 home runs, 784 RBI, 47 stolen bases, 412 bases on balls, .372 on-base percentage and .449 slugging percentage. He finished his career with a .967 fielding percentage playing at left and right field.

In 1975, the new Disch-Falk Field at the University of Texas was named in honor of Falk and his former coach, Billy Disch. He died at age 90 in Austin.

Head coaching record

College baseball
The records shown below are only the collegiate record, not the overall record against not collegiate teams.

Managerial record

References

External links

Interview with baseball player Bibb Falk, with comments (sound recording) (1974) by Eugene C. Murdock, available at Cleveland Public Library's Digital Gallery. Site states: "Interview with Bibb Falk by Dr. Eugene Murdock on June 3, 1974 in Austin, TX (75 min.)"
 

1899 births
1989 deaths
Baseball players from Austin, Texas
Major League Baseball left fielders
Chicago White Sox players
Cleveland Indians players
Texas Longhorns baseball players
Texas Longhorns baseball coaches
Cleveland Indians managers
Boston Red Sox coaches
Toledo Mud Hens managers
National College Baseball Hall of Fame inductees
Toledo Mud Hens players
Baseball coaches from Texas
Austin High School (Austin, Texas) alumni